The Warship Support Agency (WSA) was a non-executive agency within the Defence Logistics Organisation (DLO) of the UK Ministry of Defence from 2001 to 2005.

History
It was created on 1 April 2001 from the amalgamation of the Naval Bases and Supply Agency and the Ship Support Agency and had its headquarters initially in Bath, England, but later moved to the MoD Abbey Wood site in Bristol. As well as project teams the WSA operated the three naval bases in Portsmouth, Plymouth and on the Clyde. In 2003 the department was placed under the superintendence of the Deputy Chief of Defence Logistics. The WSA was amalgamated in 2005 as part of a major restructuring exercise and became part of the Defence Logistics Organisation.

Chief Executive Warship Support Agency
Included:
 John C. Coles: CB. FR Eng. 2001-2005 (held joint title of Director General Equipment Support (Sea)

Deputy Chief Executive of Warship Support Agency
Included:
 Rear-Admiral Jonathon Reeve 2004-2005

Organisations and Offices under the Warship Support Agency
At various times included:
 Defence Helicopter Support Authority
 Director (Defence Munitions)
 Director Naval Aviation Support
 Director Operations Rotary Wing
 Director-General Aircraft (Navy)
 Flag Officer Scotland, Northern England and Northern Ireland
 Naval Base Commander (Clyde)
 Naval Base Commander (Devonport)
 HMNB Portsmouth
 Naval Bases and Supply Agency

References

2001 establishments in the United Kingdom
Government agencies established in 2001
Defence agencies of the United Kingdom
2005 disestablishments in the United Kingdom